SM UB-25 was a German Type UB II submarine or U-boat in the German Imperial Navy during World War I. The U-boat was ordered on 30 April 1915 and launched on 9 October 1915. She was commissioned into the German Imperial Navy on 11 December 1915 as SM UB-25. She was raised on 22 March 1917 by the salvage ship  and served on as a training boat until surrendered to the Allies at Harwich on 26 November 1918 in accordance with the requirements of the Armistice with Germany. She was sold by the British Admiralty to George Cohen on 3 March 1919 for £750 (excluding her engines), and was broken up at Canning Town.

Design
A German Type UB II submarine, UB-25 had a displacement of  when at the surface and  while submerged. The submarine was powered by two Benz six-cylinder diesel engines each producing a total , a Siemens-Schuckert electric motor producing , and one propeller shaft.

UB-25 was fitted with two  torpedo tubes, four torpedoes, and one  SK L/40 deck gun. She had a complement of twenty-one crew members and two officers and a thirty-second dive time.

Notes

References

Bibliography 

 

1915 ships
Ships built in Bremen (state)
World War I submarines of Germany
German Type UB II submarines
U-boats commissioned in 1915